The 1961–62 FA Cup was the 81st staging of the world's oldest football cup competition, the Football Association Challenge Cup, commonly known as the FA Cup. Tottenham Hotspur won the competition for the fourth time, beating Burnley 3–1 in the final at Wembley. In doing so, they became the first team to retain the FA Cup since Newcastle United's victory in 1952, and the fourth team ever to do so.

Matches were scheduled to be played at the stadium of the team named first on the date specified for each round, which was always a Saturday. If scores were level after 90 minutes had been played, a replay would take place at the stadium of the second-named team later the same week. If the replayed match was drawn further replays would be held until a winner was determined. If scores were level after 90 minutes had been played in a replay, a 30-minute period of extra time would be played.

Calendar

First Round Proper

At this stage clubs from the Football League Third and Fourth Divisions joined those non-league clubs having come through the qualifying rounds (except Walthamstow Avenue and West Auckland Town , who given byes to this round). Matches were scheduled to be played on 4 November 1961, although three games were not played until the midweek fixture. Nine were drawn and went to replays, with one fixture requiring a second replay.

Second Round Proper
The matches were scheduled for 25 November 1961. Four matches were drawn, with replays taking place later the same week.

Third Round Proper
The 44 First and Second Division clubs entered the competition at this stage. The matches were scheduled for 6 January 1962, with seven matches postponed until later dates. Ten matches were drawn and went to replays, with two of these requiring a second replay.

Fourth Round Proper
The matches were scheduled for 27 January 1962, with three Lancashire-based games postponed until the midweek fixtures. Five matches were drawn and went to replays, which were all played in the following midweek match.

Fifth Round Proper
The matches were scheduled for 17 February 1962. Two matches went to replays in the following mid-week fixtures, with the Liverpool–Preston North End game requiring a second replay (at Old Trafford) before the tie was settled.

Sixth Round Proper

The four quarter-final ties were scheduled to be played on 10 March 1962. Two matches went to replays on the 14th before being settled.

Semi-finals

The semi-final matches were played on 31 March 1962 with a replay being required between Burnley and Fulham on 9 April 1962. Tottenham and Burnley came through the semi final round to meet at Wembley.

Replay

Final

The 1962 FA Cup final took place on 5 May 1962 at Wembley Stadium and was won by Tottenham Hotspur over Burnley, by a 3–1 scoreline. Due to the lack of passion and excitement, replaced by patience and cautious play, the final was dubbed "The Chessboard Final". Tottenham took to the field as holders, having won the League and FA Cup Double in 1961.

References
General
The FA Cup Archive at TheFA.com
English FA Cup 1961/62 at Soccerbase
F.A. Cup results 1961/62 at Footballsite
Specific

 
FA Cup seasons
Fa
Eng